Wila Kunka (Aymara wila red, kunka throat, "red throat", also spelled Huilacunca, Velacunca, Vilacunca, Wila Cunca, Wilacunca) may refer to:

 Wila Kunka, a mountain in the districts of Macusani and Ollachea, Carabaya Province, Puno Region, Peru
 Wila Kunka (Bolivia), mountain in the La Paz Department, Bolivia
 Wila Kunka (Corani), a mountain in the Corani District, Carabaya Province, Puno Region, Peru
 Wila Kunka (Cusco), a mountain in the Cusco Region, Peru